James River Correctional Center was a medium-security state-run correctional facility in Goochland County, Virginia, USA near Crozier, Virginia.

Opened 1896 but built in 1913, the center housed approximately 450 male prisoners at any given time.   The facility was closed effective April 1, 2011.

External links
 James River Correctional Center
 James River Correctional Center to close, Richmond Times-Dispatch, January 7, 2011

Buildings and structures in Goochland County, Virginia
James River (Virginia)
Defunct prisons in Virginia
1896 establishments in Virginia
2011 disestablishments in Virginia